Nantmawr is a village in Shropshire, England. It is located about 5 miles south west of Oswestry and close to the Welsh border. The Offa's Dyke Path runs through the village.

Like many of the towns in the Welsh Marches, the area was formerly Welsh speaking, and its name means "big stream".

The village also forms the terminus of the surviving stub of the former Potteries, Shrewsbury & North Wales Railway, better known as the 'Potts Line', which is currently being re-opened as a heritage railway by the Tanat Valley Light Railway Company.

Nantmawr has a nature reserve known as "Jones' Rough" managed by Shropshire Wildlife Trust. It is a breeding place for the pearl-bordered fritillary butterfly.

External links

Tanat Valley Light Railway Company Website

Villages in Shropshire